The Raelettes (or occasionally The Raelets or The Raeletts) were an American girl group formed in 1958 to provide backing vocals for Ray Charles. They were reformed from the group The Cookies. Between 1966 and 1973, the Raelettes recorded on Tangerine Records as a separate act produced and accompanied by Charles.

History 
Reformed by Ray Charles from the all-girl singing group The Cookies, Charles first invited The Cookies for a recording session in New York City, in August 1956, where they taped "Lonely Avenue", "I Want To Know" and "Leave My Woman Alone". The Cookies' lineup at the time consisted of Margie Hendrix, Dorothy Jones, and Darlene McCrea.

The Raelettes were officially established in 1958. The first lineup consisted of Darlene McCrea, Margie Hendricks, Patricia Lyles, and Gwendolyn Berry. The Raelettes were an integral part of Charles' organization and provided backing vocals on various hits, such as "Night Time Is the Right Time" (1958), "What'd I Say" (1959) and "Hit the Road Jack" (1961).

In the early years, Margie Hendrix was the Raelette's foremost member. Ray Charles said about her: "Aretha, Gladys, Etta James — these gals are all bad, but on any given night, Margie will scare you to death." Ray and Margie had many affairs, but she started using drugs and alcohol and after a final argument in 1964, she was fired from the Raelettes and later died in 1973.

The group always consisted of 4 or 5 singers. The ever-changing lineup included Minnie Riperton, Merry Clayton, Clydie King of the Blackberries, Edna Wright of Honey Cone, and latter-day Supreme Susaye Greene.

Charles also produced and played piano on solo singles for various Raelettes. He formed Tangerine Records in 1962, and the Raeletts released three top 40 R&B hits between 1967 and 1971: "One Hurt Deserves Another" (1967), "I'm Gettin' 'Long All Right" (1968), and "Bad Water" (1971). The compilation Souled Out was released in 1970, featuring songs R&B duo Ike & Tina Turner had recorded for Tangerine.

In the 1970s, Mable John sang lead vocals and the Raelttes toured independent of Charles. After she left the Raelettes returned to the background for good, with various lineups backing Charles until his death in 2004.

Members

Shalaine Adams  
Mabel Armed 
Fritz Basket  
Dorothy Berry 
Gwen "Squatty Roo" Berry 
Tangy Biggers 
Anita Brooks 
Alexandra Brown 
Helen Bryant 
Dottie Clark 
Merry Clayton  
Chrylynn Cobb 
Trudy Cochran 
Kathryn Collier 
Sharon Creighton 
Pamela Diggs-King 
Karen Evans 
Verlyn Flenaugh 
Lillian Fort 
Valerie Geason 
Renee Georges 
Deborah Gleese 
Rita Graham 
Susaye Greene 
Katrina Harper-Cooke 
Avis Harrell 
Margie Hendrix 
Peggy Hutcherson 
Denise Jackson 
Doretta James 
Mable John 
Ann Johnson 
Clydie King 
Beverly Ann Lesure 
Pat Lion 
Pat (Priscilla) Lyles 
Kathy Mackey 
Tammy McCann 
Marilyn McCoo 
Gladezz McCoy
Darlene McCrea 
Tonette McKinney 
Paula Michelle 
Janice Mitchell 
Mae Mosely-Lyles 
Vernita Moss 
Paula More 
Kay Nickerson 
Pat Peterson 
Bobbie Pierce 
Madelyn Quebec 
Patricia Richards 
Minnie Riperton
Donna M. Jones
Ruby Rae Roberson 
Vermetea Royster 
Mae Saunders 
Cynthia Scott 
Linda Sims 
Bettye Smith 
Gwendolyn Smith 
Joy Styles 
Barbara Nell Terrault 
Brianna Perry Tucker 
Andromeda Turre 
Lalomie Washburn 
Tracey Whitney 
Elaine Woodard 
Angela Workman 
Edna Wright 
Estella Yarbrough

Discography

Albums 

 1970: Souled Out (Tangerine 1511) – The Raelets with Ike & Tina Turner
 1972: (Ray Charles Presents) The Raeletts, Yesterday... Today... Tomorrow (Tangerine 1515)
 1993: The Raelettes, Hits And Rarities (Titanic Records TR-CD 4422)

Singles

References

External links
 
 Rita Graham website
 
 Ray Charles Personnel and Co-Performers
 Ray Charles & The Raelettes

African-American girl groups
Ray Charles
Musical backing groups
Tangerine Records artists
Musical groups established in the 1950s
Musical groups disestablished in the 2000s
1950s establishments in the United States
2000s disestablishments in the United States